Club Deportivo Aguilar is a football team based in Aguilar de Campoo in the autonomous community of Castile and León. Founded in 1947, it plays in the Primera Provincial. Its stadium is Ciudad Deportiva Alberto Fernández with a capacity of 6,000 seats.

Season to season

7 seasons in Tercera División

External links
Futbolme team profile 

Football clubs in Castile and León
Association football clubs established in 1947
Divisiones Regionales de Fútbol clubs
1947 establishments in Spain
Province of Palencia